Toceni is a commune in Cantemir District, Moldova. It is composed of two villages, Toceni and Vîlcele.

Notable people
 Nicolae Ciornei

References

Communes of Cantemir District
Populated places on the Prut